The Nine Yards is the debut studio album by American rapper Paperboy. It was released on January 26, 1993 through Next Plateau Entertainment. Production was handled by Rhythm D, with Aaron Clark, Dave Ferguson and John Ferguson serving as executive producers. It features guest appearances from Rhythm D and Angela Dauphiney. The album peaked at number 48 on the US Billboard 200 and number 26 on the Top R&B/Hip-Hop Albums. It was certified Gold by the Recording Industry Association of America on June 22, 1993 for selling 500,000 units in the United States. Its lead single, "Ditty", reached number 10 on the Billboard Hot 100 and achieved Platinum status by the RIAA.

Track listing

Sample credits
Tracks 1 and 10 contain portions of "Do Wa Ditty (Blow That Thing)" written by Roger Troutman and Larry Troutman
Track 6 contains elements from "Future Shock" written by Curtis Mayfield

Personnel
Mitchell "Paperboy" Johnson – main artist
Angela Dauphiney – backing vocals (tracks: 2, 3)
David Cochrane – lead guitar, bass, saxophone, flute, engineering
David "Rhythm D" Weldon – producer, arrangement
Ben Liebrand – remixer (track 1)
Desmond "Divine" Houston – remixer (track 10)
Gary "D.J. GLE" Ellis – engineering, mixing
Phil Austin – mastering
Jason Vogel – engineering (track 10)
Aaron Clark – executive producer
Dave Ferguson – executive producer
John Ferguson – executive producer
Jenniene Leclercq – art direction
Jeff Faville – design
Michael Miller – photography

Charts

Certifications

References

External links

1993 debut albums
Albums produced by Rhythum D